Rickardite is a telluride mineral, a copper telluride (Cu7Te5) or Cu3-x (x = 0 to 0.36)Te2. It was first described for an occurrence in the Good Hope Mine, Vulcan district, Gunnison County, Colorado, US, and named for mining engineer Thomas Arthur Rickard (1864–1953).  It is a low temperature hydrothermal mineral that occurs associated with vulcanite, native tellurium, cameronite, petzite, sylvanite, berthierite, pyrite, arsenopyrite and bornite.

See also
 List of minerals

References

D. M. Chizhikov and V. P. Shchastlivyi, 1966, Tellurium and Tellurides, Nauka Publishing, Moscow 

Copper(I,II) minerals
Telluride minerals
Orthorhombic minerals
Minerals in space group 59
Minerals described in 1903